Machang station is a subway station in Kaifu District, Changsha, Hunan, China, operated by the Changsha subway operator Changsha Metro. It entered revenue service on June 28, 2016.

History 
The station opened on 28 June 2016.

Layout

Surrounding area
 Fuyuanlu Bridge
 Entrance No. 1: Fayuan Village
 Entrance No. 2: Shuntian - Beiguo Fengguang Village

References

Railway stations in Hunan
Railway stations in China opened in 2016